A.Vemavaram is a village in Amalapuram Mandal, Dr. B.R. Ambedkar Konaseema district in the state of Andhra Pradesh in India.

Geography
It is located on the island between the River Godavari and the Bay of Bengal.

Demographics
As of the Census of 2011, A.Vemavaram has a population of 3,854 of which 1,903 were males while 1,951 were females, sex ratio is 1025. Population of children (age 0–6) was 360 which makes up 9.34% of total population of village. Literacy rate of the village was 79.39%.

References 

Villages in Amalapuram Mandal